Carlson may refer to:

 Carlson (name), people with the given name or surname
 Carlson Companies, American conglomerate
 CWT, subsidiary
 Radisson Hotel Group, former subsidiary formerly known as Carlson Rezidor
 Carlson Inlet, Antarctica
 Carlson Library, University of Rochester, New York, USA
 Carlson Park, Culver City, California, USA
 Carlson's patrol, USMC operation during Guadalcanal campaign
 Carlson Stadium, Decorah, Iowa, USA
 Carlson's theorem, uniqueness theorem about a summable expansion of an analytic function
 Chester County G. O. Carlson Airport, Coatesville, Pennsylvania, USA
 Stromberg-Carlson, American telecommunications equipment manufacturing company

See also
 Carleson, a surname
 Carlsen (disambiguation)
 Carlsson (disambiguation)
 Karlson (disambiguation)
 Karlsson (disambiguation)